Bratilovo is a rural locality (a village) in Aserkhovskoye Rural Settlement, Sobinsky District, Vladimir Oblast, Russia. The population was 14 as of 2010.

Geography 
Bratilovo is located 11 km southeast of Sobinka (the district's administrative centre) by road. Litovka is the nearest rural locality.

References 

Rural localities in Sobinsky District